Monke may refer to:

People

Surname or alias
 Anja Monke (born 1977), German golfer
 John Monke ( 1650–1701), British politician
 Monke, alias of Sir Thomas Monck (1570–1627), British politician

Fictional
 Roxy Monke, a character in The Power (Alderman novel)

Other uses
 Monke, an alternative spelling of monk, a person who practices religious asceticism by monastic living
 Return to Monke, a modern internet meme

See also
 Monk (surname)
 Monk (disambiguation)
 Monkey (disambiguation)